Amt Gramzow is an Amt ("collective municipality") in the district of Uckermark, in Brandenburg, Germany. Its seat is in Gramzow.

The Amt Gramzow consists of the following municipalities:
Gramzow
Grünow
Oberuckersee
Randowtal
Uckerfelde
Zichow

Demography

References 

Gramzow
Uckermark (district)